Drechsler is a German surname, literally meaning "woodturner" or "lathe operator" and may refer to:

 Charles Drechsler (1892–1986), American mycologist
 Dave Drechsler (born 1960), former guard in the National Football League 
 Debbie Drechsler (born 1953), American illustrator and comic book creator
 Hanno Drechsler (1931–2003), German political scientist
 Heike Drechsler (born 1964), German track and field athlete
 Joseph Drechsler (1782–1852), Austrian organist, composer and conductor
 Karl Drechsler (1800–1873), German cellist
 Margot Dreschel (1908–1945), SS-Aufseherin at many Nazi German concentration camps.
 Otto-Heinrich Drechsler (1895–1945), German dentist, mayor of Lübeck, General Commissioner of Latvia for the Nazi occupation regime
Paul Drechsler, Irish businessman.
 Werner Drechsler (1923–1944), German U-boat crewman
 Wolfgang Drechsler (born 1963), member of the Order of Merit of the Federal Republic of Germany

See also
Drexler
Trexler (disambiguation)
Turner

German-language surnames
Occupational surnames

lv:Drekslers (nozīmju atdalīšana)
ru:Дрекслер